Chouf (also spelled Shouf, Shuf or Chuf, in  Jabal ash-Shouf) is a historic region of Lebanon, as well as an administrative district in the governorate (muhafazat) of Mount Lebanon.

Geography
Located south-east of Beirut, the region comprises a narrow coastal strip notable for the Christian town of Damour, and the valleys and mountains of the western slopes of Jabal Barouk, the name of the local Mount Lebanon massif, on which the largest forest of Cedars of Lebanon is found. The mountains are high enough to receive snow.

History

The Emirs of Lebanon used to have their residence in Chouf, most notably Druze Emir Fakhr al-Din II, who attained considerable power and acted with significant autonomy from the Ottoman Empire in the 17th century. He is often referred to as the founder of modern Lebanon, although his area of influence and later control included parts of current Israel and Syria. Other emirs include the more controversial Bachir Chehab II, who built the magnificent palace of Beiteddine during the first half of the 19th century, but whose policies are believed to have catalyzed the first sectarian conflict in Lebanon between the traditionally dominant Druzes and the Maronites. Another historical town, just facing Beiteddine, is Deir al Qamar (the monastery of the Moon).

The relationship between the Druze and Christians in Chouf has been characterized by harmony and peaceful coexistence, and they lived in the Chuf Mountains in the past in complete harmony. The Maronite Catholics and the Druze founded modern Lebanon in the early eighteenth century, through the ruling and social system known as the "Maronite-Druze dualism" in Mount Lebanon Mutasarrifate.

Chouf is the heartland of the Lebanese Druze community, with Druze leader Walid Jumblatt residing at the Jumblatt palace in the town of Moukhtara. Several violent clashes have occurred between Druze and Christians, as in 1848, 1860 and most recently 1983-1984, during the Lebanese Civil War (Mountain War, Arabic: Harb el-Jabal). At the end of January 1989 Walid Jumblatt launched an initiative to help Christians return to their mountain homes. An estimated 300,000 Christians had abandoned their properties during the fighting. The initiative was supported by Dany Chamoun. The plan was withdrawn 5 March following General Aoun’s blockade of the Druze port at Jieh, his subsequent shelling of Souq El Gharb and the assassination of one of Jumblatt’s top aides. Reconciliation between the Druze and Christian communities came to fruition on August 8, 2001, when the Maronite Patriarch of Antioch, Cardinal Mar Nasrallah Boutros Sfeir made a historic visit to the Chouf and met with the Druze and Chouf leader, Walid Jumblatt.

On 28 February 1989 an Israeli air-strike on the Chouf killed three school children and damaged their school. Twenty-two others were wounded. It was the third IAF attack on Lebanon since the beginning of the year.

The Chouf is one of the best-preserved Lebanese districts and its nature has been generally spared from the intense building of neighboring Metn and Kesrouan.

Demographics

Despite the historical feuds between 
Sunni Muslims and Christian Maronites and Druze, the Chouf district is still one of the most religiously diverse regions in Lebanon. Currently the region hosts equal proportions of Druze, Sunni Muslims, and Christians (Maronite and Greek Catholic) populations. The Druze and Sunnis each make up around 35% of the population, and the remaining 30% is Christian.

Notable cities and towns

Ainbal
Ain Zhalta
Ammatour
Baadarâne
Baakline
Barja
Barouk
Beitedine
Bourjain
Brih
Bsaba
Chhime
Dahr El Maghara
Damour
Daraya
Deir el Qamar
Dibbiyeh 
Gharife
Haret Jandal
Fouara
Jahlieh
Jdaideh
Jiyyeh
Joun 
Kahlouniye
Kfarfakoud
Moukhtara 
Na'ameh
Niha Chouf 
Rmeileh
Serjbel
Shheem
Zaarourieh

See also
Iqlim al-Kharrub, historical region located in the Chouf District

References

 
Districts of Lebanon
Druze in Lebanon